Luca Strabucchi (born 15 June 1999) is a Chilean rugby union player, currently playing for Súper Liga Americana de Rugby side Selknam. His preferred position is centre, wing or fullback.

Professional career
Strabucchi signed for Súper Liga Americana de Rugby side Selknam ahead of the 2022 Súper Liga Americana de Rugby season. He had previously played for both the Chile national side and the Chile Sevens side. He competed for the Chile at the 2022 Rugby World Cup Sevens in Cape Town.

References

External links

1999 births
Living people
Chilean rugby union players
Rugby union centres
Rugby union wings
Rugby union fullbacks
Selknam (rugby union) players
Chile international rugby union players